Nic Curry is a Canadian provincial politician, who was elected as the Member of the Legislative Assembly of Manitoba for the riding of Kildonan in the 2016 election. He is a member of the Manitoba Progressive Conservative Party.

He did not stand for reelection in the 2019 Manitoba general election.

Election result

References 

Living people
21st-century Canadian politicians
Progressive Conservative Party of Manitoba MLAs
Year of birth missing (living people)